Michael Gandy  (born 28 August 1944) is an Australian former cricketer. He played one first-class match for Tasmania in a tour match against West Indies in January 1969. He later became an umpire, officiating in one Women's Test, six first-class matches and one List A cricket match.

Gandy was awarded the Medal of the Order of Australia (OAM) in the 2019 Australia Day Honours for "service to cricket".

See also
 List of Tasmanian representative cricketers

References

External links
 

1944 births
Living people
Australian cricketers
Tasmania cricketers
Cricketers from Hobart
Recipients of the Medal of the Order of Australia
Australian cricket umpires